caprin family member 2, also known as CAPRIN2, is a human gene.

The protein encoded by this gene may be involved in the transitioning of erythroblasts from a highly proliferative state to a terminal phase of differentiation. High level expression of the encoded protein can lead to apoptosis. Several transcript variants encoding different isoforms have been found for this gene.

Model organisms

Model organisms have been used in the study of CAPRIN2 function. A conditional knockout mouse line, called Caprin2tm1a(EUCOMM)Wtsi was generated as part of the International Knockout Mouse Consortium program — a high-throughput mutagenesis project to generate and distribute animal models of disease to interested scientists — at the Wellcome Trust Sanger Institute.

Male and female animals underwent a standardized phenotypic screen to determine the effects of deletion. Twenty two tests were carried out on mutant mice, however no significant abnormalities were observed.

References

External links

Further reading 
 

Genes mutated in mice